Agelena is a genus of agelenid spiders first described by Charles Athanase Walckenaer in 1805. Sometimes referred to as Eurasian grass spiders, they trap their prey by weaving entangling non-sticky funnel webs. They are limited to the Old world, occurring from Africa to Japan. Many species have been moved to other genera, particularly to Allagelena, Benoitia and Mistaria.

Agelena limbata is one of the most common web-weaving spider species in Japan.

Species
, the World Spider Catalog accepted 46 species:

Agelena annulipedella Strand, 1913 — Central Africa
Agelena atlantea Fage, 1938 — Morocco
Agelena australis Simon, 1896 — South Africa
Agelena babai Tanikawa, 2005 — Japan
Agelena barunae Tikader, 1970 — India
Agelena borbonica Vinson, 1863 — Réunion
Agelena canariensis Lucas, 1838 — Canary Is., Morocco, Algeria
Agelena chayu Zhang, Zhu & Song, 2005 — China
Agelena choi Paik, 1965 — Korea
Agelena consociata Denis, 1965 — Gabon
Agelena cuspidata Zhang, Zhu & Song, 2005 — China
Agelena doris Hogg, 1922 — Vietnam
Agelena dubiosa Strand, 1908 — Ethiopia, Rwanda
Agelena funerea Simon, 1909 — East Africa
Agelena gaerdesi Roewer, 1955 — Namibia
Agelena gautami Tikader, 1962 — India
Agelena gomerensis Wunderlich, 1992 — Canary Is.
Agelena gonzalezi Schmidt, 1980 — Canary Is.
Agelena hirsutissima Caporiacco, 1940 — Ethiopia
Agelena howelli Benoit, 1978 — Tanzania
Agelena incertissima Caporiacco, 1939 — Ethiopia
Agelena inda Simon, 1897 — India
Agelena injuria Fox, 1936 — China
Agelena jirisanensis Paik, 1965 — Korea
Agelena labyrinthica (Clerck, 1757) — Europe to Central Asia, China, Korea, Japan
Agelena limbata Thorell, 1897 — China, Korea, Myanmar, Laos
Agelena lingua Strand, 1913 — Central Africa
Agelena littoricola Strand, 1913 — Central Africa
Agelena longipes Carpenter, 1900 — Britain
Agelena lukla Nishikawa, 1980 — Nepal, China
Agelena maracandensis (Charitonov, 1946) — Central Asia
Agelena nigra Caporiacco, 1940 — Ethiopia
Agelena oaklandensis Barman, 1979 — India
Agelena orientalis C. L. Koch, 1837 — Italy to Central Asia, Iran
Agelena poliosata Wang, 1991 — China
Agelena republicana Darchen, 1967 — Gabon
Agelena satmila Tikader, 1970 — India
Agelena secsuensis Lendl, 1898 — China
Agelena sherpa Nishikawa, 1980 — Nepal
Agelena shillongensis Tikader, 1969 — India
Agelena silvatica Oliger, 1983 — Russia (Far East), China, Japan
Agelena suboculata Simon, 1910 — Namibia
Agelena tenerifensis Wunderlich, 1992 — Canary Is.
Agelena tenuella Roewer, 1955 — Cameroon
Agelena tenuis Hogg, 1922 — Vietnam
Agelena tungchis Lee, 1998 — Taiwan

Former species
Species formerly placed in the genus Agelena include:
Agelena agelenoides Walckenaer, 1841 → Gorbiscape agelenoides
Agelena jaundea Roewer, 1955 → Mistaria jaundea
Agelena jumbo Strand, 1913 → Mistaria jumbo
Agelena keniana Roewer, 1955 → Mistaria keniana
Agelena kiboschensis Lessert, 1915 → Mistaria kiboschensis
Agelena lawrencei Roewer, 1955 → Mistaria lawrencei
Agelena longimamillata Roewer, 1955 → Mistaria longimamillata
Agelena moschiensis Roewer, 1955 → Mistaria moschiensis
Agelena mossambica Roewer, 1955 → Mistaria mossambica
Agelena nyassana Roewer, 1955 → Mistaria nyassana
Agelena tadzhika Andreeva, 1976 → Benoitia tadzhika
Agelena teteana Roewer, 1955 → Mistaria teteana
Agelena zuluana Roewer, 1955 → Mistaria zuluana

Gallery

References

Agelenidae
Araneomorphae genera
Cosmopolitan spiders
Spiders of Africa
Spiders of Asia
Spiders of Europe
Taxa named by Charles Athanase Walckenaer